The Jurmo-class landing craft is a type of military transport in use by the Finnish Navy. The manufacturer Marine Alutech designates it as Watercat M12.

History
The Jurmo was the result of modernisation in the Finnish Navy in the late 1990s. It was designed to replace the existing Uisko class landing craft. Its main purpose is landing and transportation operations for the Finnish Coastal Jaegers in all weather conditions. It has good maneuverability and can come to a full stop in only one ship length from top speed. Low draft makes it suitable for amphibious assault even in shallow waters.

The Jurmo can transport 3 tons of cargo or 22 men.

The Jurmo is currently being evaluated by the German and Greek navies, and a number of the slightly larger and more powerful M14 version will also be delivered to the Royal Malaysian Police.

Operators 
 Finnish Navy: U601-U638

Royal Malaysian Police: 10 vessels of the Watercat M14 version.

Related development
G class landing craft
Uisko class landing craft
Watercat M14 class landing craft

References

External links

Finnish Defence Forces Website of The Finnish Defence Forces
Marine Alutech Website of Marine Alutech
 Watercat M12

Ships of the Finnish Navy
Ships built in Finland
Landing craft
Military boats